Knox is an unincorporated community in Knox County, in the U.S. state of Ohio.

History
A post office called Knox was established in 1826, and remained in operation until 1872.

References

Unincorporated communities in Knox County, Ohio
1826 establishments in Ohio
Populated places established in 1826
Unincorporated communities in Ohio